The 2020–21 Oral Roberts Golden Eagles men's basketball team represented Oral Roberts University in the 2020–21 NCAA Division I men's basketball season. The Golden Eagles, led by fourth-year head coach Paul Mills, played their home games at the Mabee Center in Tulsa, Oklahoma, as members of the Summit League. They finished the season 18–11, 10–5 in Summit League Play to finish in 4th place. They defeated North Dakota, South Dakota State, and North Dakota State to be champions of the Summit League tournament. They received the conference’s automatic bid to the NCAA tournament where they upset Ohio State and Florida to advance to the Sweet Sixteen where they lost to Arkansas.

Previous season
The Golden Eagles finished the 2019–20 season 17–14, 9–7 in Summit League play to finish in a tie for fourth place. They defeated Omaha in the quarterfinals of the Summit League tournament, before losing in the semifinals to North Dakota State.

Roster

Schedule and results

|-
!colspan=12 style=| Non-conference regular season

|-
!colspan=9 style=| Summit League regular season

|-
!colspan=12 style=| Summit League tournament
|-

|-
!colspan=12 style=| NCAA tournament

Source

References

Oral Roberts Golden Eagles men's basketball seasons
Oral Roberts Golden Eagles
Oral Roberts Golden Eagles men's basketball
Oral Roberts Golden Eagles men's basketball
Oral Roberts